Kalateh-ye Andadeh (also Romanized as Kalāteh-ye Andādeh; also known as Mīānābād-e Joveyn) is a village in Bala Jowayin Rural District, in the Central District of Jowayin County, Razavi Khorasan Province, Iran. At the 2006 census, its population was 706, in 172 families.

References 

Populated places in Joveyn County